Jacoby Rashi'd Jones (born July 11, 1984) is a former American football wide receiver and return specialist. He played college football at Lane College, and was drafted by the Houston Texans in the third round of the 2007 NFL Draft. He played for the Texans from 2007 to 2011. Jones then played for the Baltimore Ravens from 2012 to 2014, and was selected for the Pro Bowl in 2012. He is known for two of the most memorable plays in the 2012 NFL playoffs as a member of the Ravens: catching a 70-yard game-tying touchdown pass in the final seconds of regulation in the AFC Divisional playoff game against the Denver Broncos, which helped lead the Ravens to an eventual 38–35 double overtime victory; and a 108-yard kickoff return for a touchdown in Super Bowl XLVII against the San Francisco 49ers, the longest play in Super Bowl history. He also played for the San Diego Chargers and Pittsburgh Steelers in 2015 and the Monterrey Steel of the National Arena League in 2017.

He is currently the wide receivers coach at Alabama State University.

Early years
Jones lived in New Orleans East. Jones attended St. Augustine High School and Marion Abramson High School in New Orleans, Louisiana. As a second-year student (junior) at St. Augustine he learned that the school considered him too small to play on the football team. Allen Woods, his godfather and the assistant principal of Abramson, advised him to transfer to that school. At Abramson, he was a letterman in football, basketball, and track. In basketball, he was an All-Metropolitan selection and an All-Area selection. In track, he was an All-Metropolitan selection and an All-Area selection, with a personal best of 10.28 seconds in the 100 meters and 21.3 seconds in the 200 meters.

His childhood house and high school were destroyed by Hurricane Katrina.

College career
Jones originally enrolled on a track scholarship at Southeastern Louisiana University
in 2002, but transferred to the Division II school Lane College in 2003.
At Lane College, Jones became a three-time All-Southern Intercollegiate Athletic Conference (SIAC) player his sophomore, junior and senior seasons as well as an excellent punt/kick returner. Jacoby is a member of Omega Psi Phi Fraternity.

Professional career

Houston Texans

Jones was drafted by the Houston Texans in the 3rd round (73rd overall) of the 2007 NFL Draft.
His first touchdown reception was against the Tennessee Titans in week 2 of the 2009 season. He also returned a punt for a 70-yard score against Miami in week 6 of the 2008 season. Jones continued to be relatively valuable as both a receiver and a returner, though he sometimes struggled with drops.

On January 15, 2012, in the 2011 AFC Divisional Playoff game against the Baltimore Ravens, Jones muffed a punt that contributed to the Texans defeat. He was rushed by Cary Williams and the ball was recovered inside the Texans 5-yard line by Jimmy Smith.

On May 1, 2012, Jones was released by the Texans.

Baltimore Ravens

On May 8, 2012, Jones signed a two-year, $7 million deal with the Baltimore Ravens.

On October 14, 2012, Jones returned a kickoff for 108 yards and a touchdown in a win against the Dallas Cowboys, tying an NFL record for longest kick return. On November 11, 2012, Jones returned a kick-off for 105 yards in the Ravens' 55–20 win over Oakland Raiders, becoming the first player to return two kicks for 105 yards or more in a season. On November 18, 2012, in a division game against the rival Pittsburgh Steelers, Jones returned a punt 63 yards for a touchdown, helping the Ravens win the game 13–10. It was the first time the Ravens returned a punt for a touchdown against the Steelers.

Jones was named to his first Pro Bowl as a kick returner for the AFC roster and was selected for the 2012 All-Pro team. His stellar play would continue in the playoffs. On January 12, 2013, in the AFC Divisional Playoff game against the Denver Broncos, the Ravens were down 35–28 and had one last chance to tie the game. On 3rd down and 3 from the Ravens own 30-yard line, Jones caught a 70-yard touchdown pass from Joe Flacco with 31 seconds left. The play, dubbed the "Rocky Mountain Rainbow" and the "Mile High Miracle", tied the game at 35 and preceded a 38-35 double overtime win for the Ravens.

In Super Bowl XLVII against the San Francisco 49ers, Jones became the first player to score a receiving touchdown and return touchdown in the same game in Super Bowl history. With under two minutes to play in the second quarter, Jones hauled in a 56-yard pass from Joe Flacco, eluding two defenders to score a touchdown. Jones then returned the opening kickoff of the second half for a 108-yard touchdown for the longest play in Super Bowl or postseason history. The Ravens won the game by a score of 34–31, earning Jones his first Super Bowl ring. Jones was then the feature player on the cover of the Super Bowl XLVII edition of Sports Illustrated.

During the 2013 regular season, Jones was injured in the Kickoff game in Week 1 when teammate Brynden Trawick ran into him during a punt return. Jones would not return until Week 6 against the Green Bay Packers, where he had his first receiving touchdown of the season. In Week 13, on Thanksgiving against the Pittsburgh Steelers, Jones returned a kickoff that would seemingly go for a touchdown, however Steelers head coach Mike Tomlin disrupted his route by "unknowingly" standing on the field while looking at the big screen in M&T Bank Stadium. The Ravens would later win by a score of 22-20. The next week, in a snowy game against the Minnesota Vikings, Jones returned a kickoff 77 yards for a touchdown in the final two minutes. The Vikings would then answer with another touchdown with 45 seconds remaining, until teammate, Marlon Brown, scored the game-winning touchdown with 4 seconds remaining, allowing the Ravens to win the game 29-26. In week 15, the Ravens played the Detroit Lions on Monday Night Football. On a crucial 3rd & 15 with two minutes left in regulation, Jones caught a pass from quarterback Joe Flacco that was good for the first down. Shortly after that, second year kicker Justin Tucker kicked a career-high and team record field goal from 61 yards for the 18-16 win. That record was later broken by Tucker in a game against the Detroit Lions in 2021. Jones had 6 receptions for 80 yards that game.

After testing the free agent market, on March 12, 2014, Jones decided to remain with the Baltimore Ravens and agreed to a four-year, $12 million contract with $4.5 million guaranteed.

Jones saw diminished productivity for the 2014 season and was released from the Baltimore Ravens on February 25, 2015. He was due $2.5 million for the 2015 season.

San Diego Chargers
On March 6, 2015, Jones signed with the San Diego Chargers. The contract was for 2-years, $5.5 million with $1.6 million guaranteed and a $1.6 million signing bonus. He was released on November 3 after the Week 8 match-up against the Ravens.

Pittsburgh Steelers
Jones was claimed off waivers by the Pittsburgh Steelers on November 5, 2015. Jones wore number 13, since his normal number 12 was unofficially retired for Terry Bradshaw. After fumbling twice against the Indianapolis Colts, Jones was demoted to backup kick returner and third-string punt returner on the depth chart. He was released on January 1, 2016.

In four games with the Steelers, Jones had 6 punt returns for 19 yards and 9 kick returns for 220 yards.

Monterrey Steel
On March 13, 2017, Jones signed with the Monterrey Steel of the National Arena League (NAL). He played in 8 games for the Steel, catching 19 passes for 169 yards and 1 touchdown. He also returned 2 field goals for 71 yards and 1 touchdown while also returning 12 kicks for 223 yards.

Retirement
On September 29, 2017, Jones signed a one-day contract with the Baltimore Ravens so he could retire as a member of the team.

NFL career statistics

Records

NFL records
 Longest kickoff return in a Super Bowl (108)
 Longest play in a Super Bowl (108)
 Most all-purpose yards in a Super Bowl (288)

Texans franchise records
 Most punt returns in a single season: 49 (2011)
 Most punt return yards in a single season: 518 (2011)
 Most punt return touchdowns in a single season: 2 (2008)
 Most career punt returns (179)
 Most career punt return touchdowns (3)
 Most career punt return yards (1,820)
 Most career all-purpose yards (5,091)

Ravens franchise records
 Most career kickoff return touchdowns (4)
 Most kickoff return touchdowns in a single season: 2 (2012) 
 Longest kickoff return: 108 (vs Dallas Cowboys, vs Pittsburgh Steelers & vs San Francisco 49ers)

Coaching career
Jones returned to his alma mater when he was named wide receivers coach with Lane College on January 16, 2018. After two seasons with the Dragons, he was back in Baltimore when Calvert Hall College High School appointed him to a similar capacity on October 6, 2020.

Dancing With the Stars
On February 24, 2013, Jones was the first star announced to be on Season 16 of Dancing With the Stars. He partnered with season 13 winner Karina Smirnoff. They reached the finals but came in third place.

References

External links

San Diego Chargers bio
Baltimore Ravens bio
Monterrey Steel bio

1984 births
Living people
St. Augustine High School (New Orleans) alumni
Players of American football from New Orleans
American football wide receivers
American football return specialists
Lane Dragons football coaches
Lane Dragons football players
Houston Texans players
Baltimore Ravens players
San Diego Chargers players
Pittsburgh Steelers players
Participants in American reality television series
Monterrey Steel players
American Conference Pro Bowl players